Umuawulu is a town in Awka South Local Government Area (LGA) of Anambra State, Nigeria located at .  The estimated population of Umuawulu by 2005 is 20,150. According to INEC register of voters 2011, Umuawulu has 4,323 total number of registered voters distributed among the 3 villages as follows, Enugwu 2,532; Umuenu 769; Agbana 1,022.

Umuawulu was ruled by H.R.H. Eze G.C. Igboamazu, alias Eze Udo (Peace King) and the Igwe 1 of Umuawulu from 1977 to 2000. Its present Traditional Ruler is H.R.H Eze Joel Maduabuchie Egwuonwu. He ascended the throne on March 13, 2014.

There are two primary schools and two secondary schools.  One of the secondary schools, Holy Cross High School, is one of the oldest schools in South East Nigeria.  There are 12 churches, including one Anglican and one Roman Catholic Church. Umuawulu is made up of three villages: Enugwu, Umuenu and Agbana, with three markets, Oye Umuawulu, Oye Umuenu and Nkwo Agbana market, each in the three villages respectively. The three markets serve as collection centers for the neighboring communities because of the strategic position of the town. The famous, however, is Oye Umuawulu located in Enugwu village. Umuawulu has boundaries with five towns, on the North is Isiagu, on the East is Amaetiti, on the West is Nibo and on the south, it is bounded by Awgbu and Mbaukwu, the later being the ancestral brother of Umuawulu.

Populated places in Anambra State